Beelsby is a village in North East Lincolnshire, England.

Beelsby population at the 2001 Census was 114, increasing to 119 at the 2011 census.

The village is the source for the River Freshney.

The Grade II listed parish church is dedicated to St. Andrew.

In 1986 agriculture was centred on two farms: one run by the Beelsby Farming Company, the other by Fenwick Brothers, and both owned by members of the same family.

References

External links

Villages in Lincolnshire
Borough of North East Lincolnshire